John David Frodsham (5 January 1930 – 5 May 2016) was a British-born Australian academic who held posts in various areas of literary studies in Iraq, Malaya, Tanzania, and Australia. After studies at Emmanuel College, Cambridge, he worked at the University of Baghdad before completing his doctorate at the Australian National University with a thesis on Xie Lingyun. He was elected to the Australian Academy of the Humanities in 1969. He became the Foundation Professor of English and Comparative Literature at Murdoch University as Foundation Dean of the School of Human Communication from 1973 to 1976.
He conducted Murdoch courses incorporating Chinese culture and literature, and in public lectures about china and its culture.

He retired from Murdoch in 2015, died in 2016, and was survived by children, grandchildren, and great-grandchildren.

His best-remembered works are likely his translations of Li He, regarded as "the gold standard" for that poet, and still in print.

Selected works

References

1930 births
2016 deaths
Academic staff of Murdoch University
British expatriate academics
Academic staff of the University of Baghdad